Henry Bond Bowlby (23 August 1823 – 27 August 1894) was an English churchman, the Bishop of Coventry (a suffragan bishop in the Diocese of Worcester) from 1891 until 1894.

Life
Born on 23 August 1823, son of Captain Peter Bowlby and Elizabeth Haslewood, he was educated at Wadham College, Oxford, where he graduated a Doctor of Divinity (DD). He became Rector of St Philip's, Birmingham in 1875, a post he retained upon becoming the first suffragan Bishop of Coventry in 1891. He was consecrated a bishop at St Paul's Cathedral on 29 September 1891, by Edward Benson, Archbishop of Canterbury. He continued in both positions until his death on 27 August 1894, aged 71 years.

Family
Bowlby married firstly, Catherine Salmon, on 29 September 1852, and they had five children. After Catherine's death in 1875, he married secondly, Sarah Blowers King, on 21 September 1886. He was the father of Henry Thomas Bowlby, headmaster of Lancing school.

References

1823 births
1894 deaths
People educated at Charterhouse School
Alumni of Ripon College Cuddesdon
Bishops suffragan of Coventry
19th-century Church of England bishops
Alumni of Wadham College, Oxford